James Johnston (born 6 March 1986) is a New Zealand rugby union player of Samoan descent who currently plays for Rouen and has represented Samoa. He has played club rugby for Wasps, Harlequins and Saracens in the Aviva Premiership. He plays at tighthead prop. He has represented . Johnston lived in Surbiton whilst playing for Harlequins, before making the move to St Albans upon signing for Saracens in 2013.
He started for Harlequins in their 2011–12 Premiership final victory over Leicester Tigers.

On 15 June 2015, James signs for Premiership rivals Wasps for the upcoming 2015–16 season. He left Wasps and announced his signing for Premiership rivals Worcester Warriors.

Johnson left Worcester as he moved to France to join Top 14 side Brive ahead of the 2017–18 season. On 11 June 2020, Johnston signed for Rouen in the French second division Pro D2 from the 2020–21 season.

References

External links
Wasps Profile

Rugby union props
1986 births
Living people
Samoa international rugby union players
Harlequin F.C. players
Saracens F.C. players
Worcester Warriors players
New Zealand sportspeople of Samoan descent
New Zealand expatriate rugby union players
Expatriate rugby union players in England
New Zealand expatriate sportspeople in England
Rugby union players from Auckland